Mayavaram V. R. Govindaraja Pillai (12 May 1912 – 11 February 1979) was a Carnatic violinist from Tamil Nadu, Southern India.

Early days
Born at Vazhuvur, a tiny but famous, village in the Kuthalam Taluk (Nagapattinam district), he lost his parents at a young age and was brought up by his maternal uncle Veerasamy Pillai, a popular Nadaswaram exponent.

He had his initial training in Carnatic music from Simizhi Sundaram Iyer who was trained under gurus from the Tyagaraja and Muthuswami Dikshitar lineages. Sundaram Iyer died in 1927, after which Govindaraja Pillai had his training under Mayavaram Boothalinga Iyer.

Govindaraja Pillai once got a chance to sing before the violin maestro Kumbakonam Rajamanickam Pillai. The latter took him as his disciple for training as a violin instrumentalist.
His trained almost daily till until midnight or sometimes, beyond. When he was on leave at home, he learned some intricacies in music from his uncle.

His Guru, Kumbakonam Rajamanickam Pillai was a much sought-after accompanist by famous Carnatic singers like Ariyakudi Ramanuja Iyengar, Maharajapuram Viswanatha Iyer, Alathur Brothers, G. N. Balasubramaniam and Chittoor Subramania Pillai. Govindaraja Pillai will sit by the side of his Guru when he accompanies the singers. In later days this helped him to adapt to their style when he himself accompanied the same Carnatic singers.

Character
Once, when his Guru Rajamanickam Pillai fell ill, Govindaraja Pillai accompanied Semmangudi Srinivasa Iyer. He handed over the payment to his Guru but the Guru refused to accept it. Govindaraja Pillai gave the same money as Guru Dakshina on the following Vijayadasami day.

Govindaraja Pillai never made use of the money paid as advance, until the program is over.
He was a lover of perfumes. So was Carnatic singer G. N. Balasubramaniam and Mridangam maestro Pazhani Subramania Pillai. "It was said that when the three performed together, the concerts were sure to be scintillating and scentillating."

As a Carnatic violinist
He has accompanied on the violin stalwarts like G. N. Balasubramaniam, Alathur Brothers, M. S. Subbulakshmi, Madurai Mani Iyer and others. In particular, Govindaraja Pillai will rise to great heights when accompanying Madurai Mani Iyer's weaving garlands of swaras. His raga replies will draw several besh besh from Mani Iyer, his daughter recalled.

He was a vidwan in Trivandrum palace. Though he performed some solo concerts, he preferred to be an accompanist.

As a teacher
Govindaraja Pillai was Dean of the Music College of the Annamalai University. He was also a member of the Selection committee of All India Radio Chennai and Tiruchirappalli. Sikkil Bhaskaran and Kuththalam Vaidyalingam Pillai are his disciples who continue his legacy.

Awards
 Kalaimamani, 1969 - awarded by Tamil Nadu Iyal Isai Nataka Manram (Tamil Nadu State Association of literature, music and theatre)
 Isai Perarignar, 1976 - awarded by Tamil Isai Sangam, Chennai

Death
After suffering through an illness for a long time, Govindaraja Pillai died in his home at Mayavaram on 11 February 1979.

References

Notes

Carnatic violinists
Indian violinists
Tamil musicians
1912 births
1979 deaths
20th-century violinists
20th-century Indian musicians